"Planez" (originally titled  "Planes") is a song by American singer Jeremih from his third studio album, Late Nights. It features American rapper J. Cole, and was released as the second single from the album. The original version of the song featured a verse from fellow Chicago native Chance The Rapper. The single garnered Jeremih's first career Grammy nomination for Best R&B Performance at the 58th Annual Grammy Awards which was held in February 2016.

Background
The song originally came about in January 2014 when Jeremih performed the song live featuring Chance the Rapper. However, this would be relegated to a remix, as the official version features J. Cole. Another remix was released featuring R&B singer August Alsina. The official version originally premiered January 17, 2015. The album version of the song omits the female voice in the intro which referenced the original album title, "Thumpy Johnson".

Awards and nominations

Charts

Certifications

References

2014 songs
2015 singles
Jeremih songs
J. Cole songs
Def Jam Recordings singles
Song recordings produced by Vinylz
Songs written by J. Cole
Songs written by Jeremih
Songs written by Vinylz
Song recordings produced by Frank Dukes